The men's decathlon event at the 2006 World Junior Championships in Athletics was held in Beijing, China, at Chaoyang Sports Centre on 16 and 17 August.  Junior implements were used, i.e. 99.0 cm (3'3) hurdles, 6 kg shot and 1.75 kg discus.

Medalists

Results

Final
16/17 August

Participation
According to an unofficial count, 25 athletes from 19 countries participated in the event.

References

Decathlon
Combined events at the World Athletics U20 Championships